Tommy McHale is an English former professional footballer who played as a full back.

Career
McHale made 38 appearances in the Football League for Bradford City between 1971 and 1973. He also played non-league football with Prescot Cables and Wigan Athletic. He played two Northern Premier League games for Wigan before leaving the club.

References

1940s births
Living people
English footballers
Association football defenders
Prescot Cables F.C. players
Bradford City A.F.C. players
Wigan Athletic F.C. players
English Football League players